Zhenan Min, is a Min Nan Chinese language spoken in the vicinity of Wenzhou, in the southeast of Zhejiang province.

The Zhenan Min people had settled in areas such as Cangnan County, Pingyang County, Yuhuan County and Dongtou County from Fujian Province as early as the Tang dynasty period (618–907) and new waves of immigrants continued during the Southern Song dynasty, Ming dynasty and the Qing dynasty periods.

Zhenan Min has in the past been influenced by Eastern Min and the Northern Min, due to its close geographical proximity with those areas. It has limited intelligibility with other Min Nan dialects, such as Teochew and Hokkien–Taiwanese. Zhenan Min, in proximity to the Wenzhou dialect and Jinxiang dialect, has also borrowed some influences from Wu Chinese, such as voiced initials (z) and noun suffixes unique to Wu Chinese (such as ).

See also
Varieties of Chinese

Hokkien-language dialects
Zhejiang
Southern Min